Semyonovka is a rural locality (a village) in Yengalyshevsky Selsoviet, Chishminsky District, Bashkortostan, Russia. The population was 44 as of 2010. There are 2 streets.

Geography 
Semyonovka is located 47 km southeast of Chishmy (the district's administrative centre) by road. Balagushevo is the nearest rural locality.

References 

Rural localities in Chishminsky District